Kadapa Junction railway station (station code: HX) is the primary railway station serving the town of Kadapa in YSR Kadapa district, Andhra Pradesh, India. The station comes under the jurisdiction of Guntakal railway division of South Coast Railways. The station has three platforms. The station is situated in Guntakal–Chennai Egmore section of the Mumbai–Chennai line.

History 
Kadapa has its own railway station in the city which was opened before independence (1866). The Mumbai–Chennai line, one of the busiest lines in the south coast region, passes through Kadapa railway station. It is one of the A category railway stations in South Coast Railway zone with three platforms and five tracks under Guntakal railway division.

Performance and earnings 
The table below shows the passenger earnings of the station.

Originating trains 
The following are the originating trains from the station.
 77402 Kadapa–Nandyal DEMU
 77404 Kadapa–Nandyal DEMU
 77405 Kadapa–Pendlimarri 
 56012 Kadapa–Arakkonam Passenger
 17488 Kadapa–Visakhapatnam Tirumala Express

New project 

A new broad-gauge line connecting Kadapa with Bangalore is in progress.

Structure and amenities 
This station is ranked amongst top 20 cleanest railway stations in India.

References

External links 

Guntakal
Railway stations in Kadapa district
Kadapa